The Gaumee Film Awards aka Dhivehi Film Awards are presented by National Centre for the Arts to honour both artistic and technical excellence of professionals in the Maldivian film industry. The Gaumee Film Award ceremony is the oldest film events in Maldives.

The ceremony had been sponsored by various private organisations in the past as well as in present provisions. A live ceremony was broadcast to television audiences.

History
A meeting was arranged at MCM on 30 October 1993, once the government decides to hold a Film Festival to honor the film industry. The awards were first introduced in 1994. Out of the twenty two people invited from the fraternity, only ten people showed up for the meeting. The preparations and award categories were discussed and decided in the meeting.

Awards 
Gaumee Film Awards are given in the following categories. Follow the links for lists of the award winners, year by year.

References

 
Awards established in 1994
1994 establishments in the Maldives